Ptychostomum is a genus of mosses belonging to the family Bryaceae. It has an almost cosmopolitan distribution.

Species
The following species are recognised in the genus Ptychostomum:
 
Ptychostomum acutiforme 
Ptychostomum altisetum 
Ptychostomum amblyodon 
Ptychostomum angustifolium 
Ptychostomum archangelicum 
Ptychostomum arcticum 
Ptychostomum austriacum 
Ptychostomum badium 
Ptychostomum bimum 
Ptychostomum bornholmense 
Ptychostomum bryoides 
Ptychostomum calophyllum 
Ptychostomum capillare 
Ptychostomum cellulare 
Ptychostomum cernuum 
Ptychostomum chorizodontum 
Ptychostomum compactum 
Ptychostomum creberrimum 
Ptychostomum cryophilum 
Ptychostomum cyclophyllum 
Ptychostomum cylindrothecium 
Ptychostomum dicarpum 
Ptychostomum donianum 
Ptychostomum elegans 
Ptychostomum funkii 
Ptychostomum hawaiicum 
Ptychostomum imbricatulum 
Ptychostomum inclinatum 
Ptychostomum intermedium 
Ptychostomum knowltonii 
Ptychostomum lamprochaete 
Ptychostomum lonchocaulon 
Ptychostomum longisetum 
Ptychostomum marratii 
Ptychostomum meesioides 
Ptychostomum minii 
Ptychostomum moravicum 
Ptychostomum neodamense 
Ptychostomum nitidulum 
Ptychostomum ovatum 
Ptychostomum pacificum 
Ptychostomum pallens 
Ptychostomum pallescens 
Ptychostomum pauperculum 
Ptychostomum pendulum 
Ptychostomum pseudotriquetrum 
Ptychostomum reedii 
Ptychostomum rubens 
Ptychostomum rutilans 
Ptychostomum salinum 
Ptychostomum schleicheri 
Ptychostomum sibiricum 
Ptychostomum subneodamense 
Ptychostomum torquescens 
Ptychostomum touwii 
Ptychostomum turbinatum 
Ptychostomum vermigerum 
Ptychostomum vernicosum 
Ptychostomum warneum 
Ptychostomum weigelii 
Ptychostomum wrightii

References

Bryaceae
Moss genera